Nëna e Vatrës or Nana e Votrës ("The Mother of the Hearth") is the goddess of the fire hearth (hyjnia e zjarrit të vatrës) in Albanian mythology and folklore, associated with fire worship, the cult of the ancestor and the cult of the woman-centered family life.

Names and etymology
Nëna e Vatrës is the deity of the hearth fire (Albanian: hyjni e zjarrit të vatrës) commonly found in the folk beliefs of the Albanians, thus there are many dialectal variations, singular or plural: Nëna e Vatrës/Nana e Votrës, E Ëma e Vatrës/E Ama e Votrës, Mëma e Vatrës/Mama e Vatrës, Shtriga e Vatrës/Votrës, Plaka e Vatrës/Votrës, Mëmat e Vatrës/Mamat e Votrës, Xhuxhet e Vatrës etc. The first element nënë/nanë or ëmë/amë, means "mother"; while the last element vatër/votër, means "hearth", "fireplace", and is related to the Avestan atar, "fire".

Folk beliefs
In Albanian folk beliefs, Nëna e Vatrës is the protector of the vatër, the domestic fireplace. It is said that the fireplace should be cleaned in the evening. If it is left uncleaned, Nëna e Vatrës becomes angry. The family members should behave respectfully towards her. At feasts, people used to practice sacrificial offerings to the deity throwing some of the food they prepared into the fire and around the hearth.

Nëna e Vatrës is akin to Greek Hestia and Roman Vesta. To the Greek and Roman goddesses well-defined public places of worship were dedicated, while in the Albanian tradition the place of worship of Nëna e Vatrës is the hearth of every house. In this aspect the Albanian cult is more similar to the ancient cult of the natural eternal fire of Nymphaion.

See also

Albanian mythology
Hestia
Vesta (mythology)
En (deity)
Verbt
Prende
Fatia
Ora (mythology)
Vitore
Gabija

Sources

Citations

Bibliography

Domestic and hearth deities
Fire goddesses
Albanian mythology
Paleo-Balkan mythology